Dolomite Bio, headquartered in Royston, Hertfordshire, UK is a biotechnology company that creates products for high throughput single cell research for biologists. Dolomite Bio is based out of five global offices including the UK (headquarters) and regional offices in the US, Japan, Vietnam and Brazil.

Dolomite Bio is part of the Blacktrace Holdings ltd.

History 
Dolomite Bio was founded in March 2016, from its sister company Dolomite Microfluidics (part of the Blacktrace group of companies). Dolomite Bio now serves all of Dolomite Microfluidics' biology customers and develops new products specifically for biologists.

Products 

Dolomite Bio creates innovative products for high throughput single cell research. By encapsulating single cells in microfluidic droplets, our products enable rapid analysis of thousands or millions of individual cells and their biological products.

Dolomite Bio's Nadia Instrument is an automated, microfluidic droplet-based platform for single cell research that encapsulates up to 8 samples, in parallel, in under 20 mins. Over 50,000 single cells can be captured per cartridge in a run. The fully automated Nadia Instrument guides users through all relevant steps of the experiment via an easy-to-use touchscreen interface.

Adding the Nadia Innovate upgrade to the Nadia Instrument transforms it into an open system, for the development of novel protocols and applications. Nadia Innovate enables the development of user-defined single cell protocols and applications. Newly developed protocols can be transferred to the Nadia Instrument for high throughput parallel operation. By allowing users to control parameters such as droplet size, droplet frequency, temperature, agitation and timing, innovation is unlocked.

The Nadia platform enables applications such as single cell RNA-Seq (scRNA-Seq), single nuclei RNA-Seq (sNuc-Seq), plant protoplast RNA-Seq (ppRNA-Seq) and the encapsulation of cells in Agarose beads.

Technology 

Dolomite Bio systems employ the principle of microfluidic flow technology focussing to rapidly encapsulate single cells in millions of aqueous droplets in oil. The droplets are identically sized and, depending on the application, may be 10 – 100 µm in diameter.

Benefits of encapsulating cells in microfluidic droplets

• Enables analysis of millions of single cells

               – e.g. more than 105 single-cell libraries/hour

• Single-cell reactions become efficient and robust

               – Droplets are small (often 10s to 100s of picolitres), so e.g., effective mRNA concentration is high

• Reliable and reproducible performance

               – Precisely-controlled micro-reactor volumes and avoidance of cross-contamination

• Droplets can be used as micro-compartments or micro-reactors

• Can capture quantitative data from rare cells

See also 
 Dolomite Micro
 Blacktrace Holdings Ltd

References

External links 
 
 Blacktrace – Holding company

Companies based in North Hertfordshire District
Biotechnology companies of the United Kingdom